Ana Maria Pavăl (born July 10, 1983) is a Romanian freestyle wrestler, who is playing for the women's 53 kilograms category. Since 2005, Pavăl had won a total of five bronze medals at the European Wrestling Championships. She is a member of CSA Steaua București, and is coached and trained by Simon Constantin and Vasile Vişan.

Paval represented Romania at the 2008 Summer Olympics in Beijing, where she competed for the women's 55 kg class. She lost the first preliminary match to China's Xu Li. Because her opponent advanced further into the final match, Pavăl offered another shot for the bronze medal by defeating Kazakhstan's Olga Smirnova in the repechage bout. She progressed to the bronze medal match, but narrowly lost by a fall to Colombia's Jackeline Rentería, finishing only in fifth place.

References

External links
Profile – International Wrestling Database
NBC Olympics Profile

Romanian female sport wrestlers
1983 births
Living people
Olympic wrestlers of Romania
Romanian sportswomen
Wrestlers at the 2008 Summer Olympics
People from Onești
20th-century Romanian women
21st-century Romanian women